Gideyevo is a rural locality (a village) in Karinskoye Rural Settlement, Alexandrovsky District, Vladimir Oblast, Russia. The population was 8 as of 2010. There are 7 streets.

Geography 
Gideyevo is located 30 km southwest of Alexandrov (the district's administrative centre) by road. Snyatinovo is the nearest rural locality.

References 

Rural localities in Alexandrovsky District, Vladimir Oblast